The China–India football rivalry or the Earth Derby, between the China and India national football teams, is one of the oldest international football rivalries in Asia. It was popularized as the 'Earth Derby' by the media in October 2018 when the two sides met in a friendly.

Background
China and India have shared cultural and economic relations which date back to ancient times. However, the rivalry between the two Asian sides is developed during the contemporary period from the intense bilateral relations which originated from the Sino-Indian war and border disputes.

History
The two sides met for the first time unofficially on 4 July 1936. It is also the India's second oldest recorded international football match. Noor Mohammed and Suen Kam Shun were the two goal scorers for their respective sides which drew 1–1 in Calcutta. The first official match took place in June 1956 in New Delhi where China emerged victorious after Cong Zheyu scored the only goal.

The recent meeting between the two sides came in 2018 when they played in a friendly as a preparation for the Asian Cup. This was the first Earth Derby in 21 years and the result was a goalless draw.

Men's matches
As of 21 April 2022

†: Unofficial matches

Summary

Women's matches
As of 21 April 2022

Summary

Honours

Men's

Women's

See also
List of association football rivalries
China–South Korea football rivalry
China–Japan football rivalry
India–Pakistan football rivalry

References

 

China–India relations
International association football rivalries
China national football team rivalries
India national football team